Big & Small is a children's television series aimed at preschoolers following the lives of two very different best friends, the eponymous Big and Small. Big & Small is a co-production between Kindle Entertainment and 3J's Productions produced in association with the BBC, Treehouse TV, and Studio 100. Three series were aired between 2008 and 2011.

Episode structure
The show starts off with the characters doing various things, such as playing a game, or building an invention. There is then a conflict between the characters that leads to the main plot of the episode. The characters then resolve their conflict before the end of the episode. There is always at least one song per episode, which is filmed in shadowmation.

Characters

Broadcasters
In the United Kingdom, Big & Small was shown on CBeebies, BBC1, and BBC2, as well as Cyw in Wales. Treehouse TV aired Big & Small in Canada. In total, over 40 channels worldwide have featured the programme.

Home Media
On March 12, 2009, ITV Global Entertainment secured the UK Home Media rights to the series. Through their ITV DVD label, the company released "We're Big & Small!" on March 30.The UK version contains the first eight episodes of Series 1 as well as three bonus shorts, while the Canadian version released by Treehouse TV omits the shorts and only includes the first five episodes. 

Two further DVDs were released in the UK: "Starry, Starry Night", containing episodes 9 to 16 of Series 1, and "The Biggest Story", containing episodes 1 to 5 and episode 16 of Series 3; the former released by ITV Studios, and the latter released by Abbey Home Media. In Canada, Treehouse TV released "Party Time!", containing five assorted episodes from Series 1 and 2.

Episodes

Series overview

Episode List

Series 1

 Something is Missing
 A Door for Small
 Fish Wish
 There's a Space for Small
 A Piece of Cake
 The Worm in Big's Apple
 The Case of the Missing Dinosaur
 Stormy Weather
 Playing by the Rules
 A Sound Idea
 Rain Dance
 My Friend Fang
 Starry Starry Night
 Bad Luck Machine
 The Big Sneeze
 The Mysterious Woods
 Surprise, Surprise
 The Sleep Toy Thingie
 Smashing Tomatoes
 Picture Perfect
 Twiba's Treasure Hunt
 The Case of the Clogs
 Twiba Takes Flight
 Cabin Fever
 Five Minute Sled
 The Gwelf In The Garden

Series 2
 Tall Small
 I Spy a Firefly
 Say Cheese
 Celery Day
 The Singing Gwelf
 The Road Not Taken
 Party Time
 Dream Team
 I See, You Saw
 The Big Race
 Abracadabra
 Frog Fight
 The Broken Scooter
 Blame it on the Drain
 Small's Branch
 Play Date
 The Case of the Missing Kohlrabi
 Promises, Promises 
 Spring Fling
 Never Say No
 The Book of Big
 A Quiet Day
 The Missing Biscuit
 Thar She Buzzes
 The Not So Happy Camper
 Big & Small Day

Series 3
 Small, Small Let Down Your Hair 
 Boingo Boys
 The Rainbow
 The Scare-Small
 The Box
 The Missing Answer
 Millions of Vegetable Soup
 Hot and Bothered
 A Room of Small's Own
 Catch a Fallen Star
 Thanks for the Memories
 Opposite Day
 Fishing for Elephants
 The Hiccups
 Friends in a Fog
 The Biggest Story
 A Room With a View
 Just What I Wanted
 Slippery Slide
 A Letter From Furthermost
 Balloonatics
 An Evening of Delights
 The Egg
 Gone Fishin'
 Hopalong Small
 Moon Race

Awards
 Awarded "Best Writing" at the 2013 KidScreen Awards
 Awarded "Best Interactive Service" for Big & Small Online at the BAFTA Children's Awards in 2009.
 Awarded "Best Children's Programme" for the episode "Blame It on the Drain" at the Royal Television Society's Educational Television Awards for 2009. Big & Small was called "A well constructed programme with great warmth, charm and child appeal."

References

External links
 
 Official Big & Small store UK 
 Big & Small Online
 Big & Small at KindleEntertainment.com
 

2000s British children's television series
2010s British children's television series
2000s British comedy television series
2010s British comedy television series
2008 British television series debuts
2011 British television series endings
2000s Canadian children's television series
2010s Canadian children's television series
2000s Canadian comedy television series
2010s Canadian comedy television series
2008 Canadian television series debuts
2011 Canadian television series endings
2000s preschool education television series
2010s preschool education television series
British television shows featuring puppetry
Canadian television shows featuring puppetry
BBC children's television shows
BBC television comedy
Treehouse TV original programming
British preschool education television series
British children's comedy television series
English-language television shows
Canadian children's comedy television series
Canadian preschool education television series
Television series by Kindle Entertainment
Television series by Corus Entertainment
CBeebies